Following the 1790 census, Georgia's apportionment was decreased from 3 seats to 2 (the only state whose representation decreased after the census). Georgia switched from separate districts to at-large seats.

See also 
 United States House of Representatives elections, 1792 and 1793
 List of United States representatives from Georgia

1792
United States House of Representatives
Georgia